Malcolm David Ross (born 1942) is an Australian linguist. He is the emeritus professor of linguistics at the Australian National University.

Ross is best known among linguists for his work on Austronesian and Papuan languages, historical linguistics, and language contact (especially metatypy). He was elected as a Fellow of the Australian Academy of the Humanities in 1996.

Career
Ross served as the Principal of Goroka Teachers College in Papua New Guinea from 1980 to 1982, during which time he self-statedly become interested in local languages, and began to collect data on them. In 1986, he received his PhD from the ANU under the supervision of Stephen Wurm, Bert Voorhoeve and Darrell Tryon. His dissertation was on the genealogy of the Oceanic languages of western Melanesia, and contained an early reconstruction of Proto Oceanic. 

Malcolm Ross introduced the concept of a linkage, a group of languages that evolves via dialect differentiation rather than by tree-like splits.

Together with Andrew Pawley and Meredith Osmond, Ross has contributed to the Proto-Oceanic Lexicon Project, which has produced several volumes of reconstructed Proto-Oceanic vocabulary in various semantic domains.

More recently, Ross has published on Formosan languages, Papuan languages and the reconstruction of Proto-Austronesian phonology and syntax.

Notes

External links
Malcolm Ross's page on the ANU website
 Malcolm Ross's Curriculum Vitae (dated 5 Oct 2020)
Malcolm Ross's entry in LinguisTree

1942 births
Living people
Academic staff of the Australian National University
Linguists of Papuan languages
Linguists of Madang languages
Linguists of Austronesian languages
Linguists of Formosan languages
Alumni of the University of Bristol
Massey University alumni
Paleolinguists
Historical linguists